Patrick Chan Siu-oi  is a judge in Hong Kong. He currently serves as a Non-Permanent Judge of the Court of Final Appeal having previously been a Permanent Judge of that court.

Early life, education and legal career
Born in Hong Kong, Chan attended Wah Yan College, Hong Kong, a prominent Jesuit high school in Hong Kong.  He received his Bachelor of Laws ("LLB") degree in 1974 and a Postgraduate Certificate in Laws in 1975 from the University of Hong Kong. He served pupillage under Patrick Yu and was called to the Hong Kong Bar in 1976. He was a barrister in private practice until he joined the Judiciary as a District Judge in 1987.

Judicial career
Between 1987 and 1991, Chan served as judge in District Courts, having been appointed a District Judge on 9 November 1987.  In 1991, he was appointed Deputy Registrar of the Supreme Court.
In 1992, he began serving as a Judge in the Court of First Instance of the High Court of Hong Kong.  

Chan was appointed the first Chief Judge of the High Court in 1997, when British colonial rule in Hong Kong ended and China resumed its sovereignty over the region. He thus became the first locally educated judge to hold that position.  

In 2000, he was appointed a Permanent Judge of the Court of Final Appeal (Hong Kong's court of last resort).  He retired in 2013 and was succeeded by Joseph Fok. He continues to serve as a Non-Permanent Judge of the Court.

During his time on the bench, Chan contributed significantly towards the development of a bilingual legal system, and served on various judicial committees advocating the greater use of Chinese in judicial proceedings and the translation of English judgments.

In February 2021, Chan claimed that there is no absolute separation of powers in Hong Kong, and that "It is more accurate to call it a division of authority."

Extra-Judicial Life
From October 2006 to September 2012, Chan was a member of the Law Reform Commission of Hong Kong.

Chan was appointed an Honorary Bencher of the Inner Temple (England and Wales) in 2001. He was conferred Honorary Fellowships by the University of Hong Kong (2003) and the Chinese University of Hong Kong (2011). He was conferred with an Honorary Doctor of Laws degree by the City University of Hong Kong (2008) and an Honorary Doctor of Laws degree by the University of Hong Kong (2011).

In 2013, Chan was awarded the Grand Bauhinia Medal, the highest honour given by the HKSAR Government.

Chan has been recognised for his contributions to legal education in Hong Kong. He was the Chairman of the Joint Examination Board on Postgraduate Certificate in Laws set up to ensure that a common standard would be maintained for postgraduate law students of both the University of Hong Kong and the City University entering the legal profession.

References

Living people
Hong Kong judges
1948 births
British Hong Kong judges